Ian Goodman Hull (20 June 1916 – 1 July 1985) was an Australian rules footballer who played with Richmond in the Victorian Football League (VFL).

Football
Hull started his career as a wingman, but played a lot of his football for Richmond at centre half-back, which was from where he played in the 1940 VFL Grand Final loss.

He did not play any senior VFL football in 1943 and 1944, due to war service. 

In 1947 Ian played 10 games, deep in defence, for the Port Adelaide Football Club in the SANFL.

References

1916 births
1985 deaths
Australian rules footballers from Victoria (Australia)
Australian Rules footballers: place kick exponents
Richmond Football Club players
Port Adelaide Football Club (SANFL) players
Port Adelaide Football Club players (all competitions)
Australian Army personnel of World War II
Australian Army officers
People from Benalla
Military personnel from Victoria (Australia)